A mobile driving licence (also mobile driver's license or mDL) is a mobile app that replaces a physical driver's license. An International Organization for Standardization (ISO) standard for the mobile driving licence (ISO 18013-5) was approved on August 18, 2021 and published on 30 September 2021.

History 
The first instance of an electronic driver's license was deployed in Mexico as early as 2007, using the Gemalto smart-card platform. In 2016, the U.S. National Institute of Standards and Technology (NIST) partnered with Gemalto to pilot the "digital driver's license" in Washington D.C., Idaho, Colorado, Maryland and Wyoming.

Colorado was the first state to deploy a production version of a digital license, primarily based on QR codes stored in a digital wallet, which it claims is accepted by police officers throughout the state. After going through the standard process at the state Department of Motor Vehicles, volunteers installed the "DigiDL" app on their phones and then downloaded the license. Volunteers tested the digital driver's license in stores, the Colorado Lottery claim center, and an art fair.

The first mDL that claims compliance with ISO 18013-5 is Louisiana's, developed in part by Envoc, a software firm in Baton Rouge, whose president claimed that most drivers under 40 won't go back home if they forget their physical laminated license, "but if they forget their phone, they always turn around." Ontario in 2020, in response to the COVID-19 pandemic, announced a "Digital Identity Program," including a mobile driver's license. Denmark in 2020 introduced a mobile driver's license which uses a QR code. According to the standard, the holder's privacy is protected since they do need to hand over their phone to provide proof of identity.

Operating system support 
Smartphone operating systems are adapting to the new standard. For example, Android's JetPack suite comes with specific support for ISO 18013–5 from version API 24. On September 1, 2021, Apple provided details about its implementation of the standard in iOS 15. Arizona and Georgia became the first two states to announce that IDs were supported. On March 23, 2022, Arizona officially launched their program which includes the first TSA checkpoint to support Apple’s mobile driver’s license, Phoenix Sky Harbor International Airport.

Conformance and testing
Safety organization UL has a product to help test an app's conformance with the ISO 18013-5 standard. The Kantara Initiative created a "Privacy & Identity Protection in Mobile Driving License Ecosystems Discussion Group" to issue a report on the need for conformance specifications around identity and privacy.

References

External links
 Status page from Thales. - frequently updated 
 Kantara/IDESG wiki - collection of privacy and notice issues 

 
Driving licences
Driver's license
Identity management